The 1957 World Table Tennis Championships – Swaythling Cup (men's team) was the 24th edition of the men's team championship.  

Japan won the gold medal defeating Hungary 5–2 in the final. China and Czechoslovakia won bronze medals after elimination from the semi final round.

Medalists

Swaythling Cup tables

Group 1

Group 2

Group 3

Group 4

Semifinals

Final

See also
List of World Table Tennis Championships medalists

References

-